Tony "Bruno" Rey is an American guitarist, writer, producer and arranger who has worked with bands including Saraya, the Mike Pont Band, Danger Danger, Billy Joel, Janet Jackson, Enrique Iglesias, Joan Jett & the Black Hearts, Kathie Lee, Taylor Dayne, Anastacia and Rihanna.

In Danger Danger, he replaced guitarist Al Pitrelli and was replaced by guitarist Andy Timmons. He played almost all of the guitar work on Danger Danger's self-titled album, with his replacement Andy Timmons playing the rest.

Rey started with Iglesias in 1999 and is the guitarist and musical director. He is responsible for all facets of Iglesias' live shows, TV shows, and award shows. Rey also writes and produces for Iglesias. One song he co-wrote was "Roamer" from Iglesias' album, 7. Rey also provided guitar on Janet Jackson's single "Just a Little While".

Discography

1980s 
Writing songs with Aldo Nova
 Saraya (1989)
 Danger Danger (1989)

1990s 
 When the Blackbird Sings, Saraya (1991)
 Scepter Records Story (1992)
 Flashback, Joan Jett (1993)
 Pure and Simple, Joan Jett (1994)
 Tank Girl Soundtrack (1995)-Vocals
 Living the Nightlife (1995)-Producer
 Biggest Man, Tommy Hunt (1997)-Producer
 We Will Fall: The Iggy Pop Tribute (1997)-Producer, Guitar
 New York Soul Serenade (1997)-Producer
 Under Cover, Joe Lynn Turner (1997)-Vocals(Background)
 Naked Without You, Taylor Dayne (1997)-Guitar(electric)
 Four the Hard Way, Danger Danger (1997) -Producer, Guitar
 Hurry Up & Wait, Joe Lynn Turner (1998)-Soloist, Guitar
 Where the Girls are, Vol 2 (1999)-Producer
 Under Cover, Vol 2 Joe Lynn Turner (1999)-Guitar

2000s 
 The Return of the Great Gildersleeves, Danger Danger (2000) - Guitar
 Heart of a Woman, Kathie Lee (2000)-Guitar
 Chansons des Perverts (2001)-Performer
 Naked Without You[Bonus Tracks], Taylor Dayne (2001)-Guitar(electric)
 Leap of Faith, David Charvet (2002)-Guitar
 Walk to Remember Soundtrack (2002)-Producer
 Walk to Remember[Bonus Tracks] (2003)-Producer
 Jett Rock: Greatest Hits, Joan Jett (2003)-Arranger
 7, Enrique Iglesias (2003)-Producer, Vocal Arranger, Guitar (Acoustic/Electric)
 7 [bonus tracks], Enrique Iglesias (2003)-Producer
 Damita Jo, Janet Jackson (2004)-Guitar
 Girl Group Sounds: One Kiss Can Lead to (2005)-Producer
 Sinner, Joan Jett (2006)-Engineer

TV appearances

References 

Tony Bruno discography info
Tony Bruno's Myspace page

American heavy metal guitarists
Danger Danger members
Living people
Year of birth missing (living people)